Shokan may refer to:
 Shokan, New York, a town in the United States
 Shokan Railroad Station, an abandoned railway station